Starland County is a municipal district located in southern Alberta, Canada.

History 
The municipality was incorporated in 1912, and established in the current boundaries in 1943, under the name Municipal District of Morrin No. 277. The name was changed the same year to Municipal District of Starland No. 277. Its name was changed again to Starland County in 1998.

Geography

Communities and localities 
The following urban municipalities are surrounded by Starland County.
Cities
none
Towns
none
Villages
Delia
Morrin (location of municipal office)
Munson
Summer villages
none

The following hamlets are located within Starland County.
Hamlets
Craigmyle
Michichi
Rowley
Rumsey (dissolved from village status in 1995)

The following localities are located within Starland County.
Localities 

Dinosaur
Dowling Lake
Gartly
Rainbow

Stonelaw
Verdant Valley
Victor

Demographics 

In the 2016 Census of Population conducted by Statistics Canada, Starland County had a population of 2,066 living in 611 of its 693 total private dwellings, a  change from its 2011 population of 2,057.

Starland County's 2013 municipal census counted a population of 2,071.

Attractions 

McLaren Dam Recreation Area
Michichi Dam Recreation Area
Starland Recreation Area

See also 
List of communities in Alberta
List of municipal districts in Alberta

References

External links 

 
Municipal districts in Alberta